Unnodu Ka is a 2016 Indian Tamil-language romantic comedy film directed by RK and produced by Abirami Ramanathan. The film features stars Aari Arujunan and Maya in the leading roles, while Prabhu plays a supporting role. Featuring music composed by C. Sathya, the film began production in January 2016.

Cast

 Prabhu as Jaivel
 Aari Arujunan as Shiva
 Maya as Abhirami
 Bala Saravanan as Bhagat Singh
 Misha Ghoshal as Sundrambal
 Urvashi as Rajalatchumi
 Narayan Lucky as Bruce Lee
 Mansoor Ali Khan as Kasi
 Subbu Panchu as Subash Chandra Bose
 M. S. Bhaskar as Master Marthaandam
 Manobala as Traffic Police
 Chaams as Deal Matrimony Owner
 Thennavan as Keerthivasan
 Sriranjani as Vaanmathi
 Sakthi Saravanan
 Shanmuga Sundaram
 Nandha Kumar
 Raja Singh
 Theni Murugan
 Vinodh Sagar
 Kiran
 Vidhya Vasan
 TNT Raja
 RJ Kumaravel
 PB Ravikumar
 Dancer Vignesh as Deal Matrimony Assistant

Production
RK announced that he was working on a project written and produced by industrialist, Abiram Ramanathan, during December 2015 and that actor Aari Arujunan would feature in the lead role. Aari was signed after negotiations with actor Chandran had fallen through. Initially titled Ka, the team later adopted the name Unnodu Ka. Maya of Darling 2 was signed on to feature in the film, as were Bala Saravanan and Misha Ghoshal in other pivotal roles. Before production began, cinematographer Sakthi Saravanan opted out and was replaced by Naga Saravanan. The film began production from January 2016, with Prabhu, Urvashi and Mansoor Ali Khan joining the lead cast. The team subsequently moved on to Karaikudi to begin the first schedule, before heading to Chennai to work on the rest of the film.

Soundtrack
Soundtrack was composed by C. Sathya.
"Oothe" - Vaimithra
"Kirukka" - Gowri Lakshmi, Bmac
"Raatinam Suttudhu" - Sathya, Sriramachandra, Kateki
"Odittanga" - Mano, Krishnaraj, Bangaramma

Reception
Times of India wrote "The story by Abirami Ramanathan has scope for a better entertainer, but the flow of sequences is sluggish for most parts of the first half." Indiaglitz wrote "'Unnodu Ka' directed by RK is a film that aspires to be funny in every scene and make you leave the movie hall with the satisfaction of having laughed out of your heart. The intentions are clear. You have to forget the logic. Cinematic liberties, predictability of the script from start to end, convenient turn of events, and all characters behaving freakily.. all are there. Most of the intended jokes don't serve the purpose. But despite all these the film manages to keep you engaged and passes through as a decent light-hearted entertainer". Vishal Menon of The Hindu felt the film was "more like a blooper reel than a full-fledged comedy".

References

External links
 

2010s Tamil-language films
2016 romantic comedy films
Indian romantic comedy films
Films scored by C. Sathya
2016 films